Evgeni Vladimirovich Rymarev (born September 9, 1988) is a Kazakhstani professional ice hockey winger currently with Kazzinc-Torpedo of the Higher Hockey League (VHL). He was transferred from Barys Astana of the Kontinental Hockey League in 2012.

Career statistics

International

External links

1988 births
Asian Games gold medalists for Kazakhstan
Asian Games medalists in ice hockey
Barys Nur-Sultan players
HC Astana players
Kazzinc-Torpedo players
Kazakhstani ice hockey right wingers
Kazakhstani people of Russian descent
Living people
Medalists at the 2011 Asian Winter Games
Sportspeople from Oskemen
Universiade medalists in ice hockey
Universiade silver medalists for Kazakhstan
Competitors at the 2013 Winter Universiade
Ice hockey players at the 2011 Asian Winter Games